Easy to Look At is a 1945 American comedy film directed by Ford Beebe and written by Henry Blankfort. The film stars Gloria Jean, Kirby Grant, J. Edward Bromberg, Eric Blore, George Dolenz, and Mildred Law. The film was released on August 10, 1945, by Universal Pictures.

Plot
Aspiring fashion designer Judy Dawson (Gloria Jean) arrives in New York and befriends Gustave Levant (J. Edward Bromberg), once a great designer himself at the House of Tyler, but now Tyler's humble night watchman. Levant asks his boss Bruce Tyler (Kirby Grant) to hire Judy, who has her own ambitious ideas. Without permission, she redesigns and alters a gown intended for an important Broadway star (Mildred Law). Levant, fearing the consequences, takes the blame for the "sabotage." Further clouding Judy's career, one of Tyler's competitors buys the prototype sketch of the redesigned gown, and now Judy is accused of industrial theft. The budding romance between Judy and Bruce turns stormy, until Levant arranges to bring them together on opening night, when Judy's Broadway creations are shown publicly.

Production
Gloria Jean, singing star for Universal since 1939, was persuaded by her agent Eddie Sherman -- who also handled the studio's biggest stars Abbott and Costello -- not to renew her contract. Sherman planned a nationwide tour of personal appearances, and informed Universal that Gloria Jean would be leaving the studio at the end of 1944. Universal had already promised exhibitors three more Gloria Jean features for 1945, so studio executives worked the actress constantly until her contract expired and the three promised features were filmed. Easy to Look At was the last of them, rushed through production by members of Universal's serial squad: director Ford Beebe, cameraman Jerry Ash, and editor Saul Goodkind. The feature was filmed in December 1944 and released on August 10, 1945.

Cast        
Gloria Jean as Judy
Kirby Grant as Tyler
J. Edward Bromberg as Gustave
Eric Blore as Butch Billings
George Dolenz as Antonio
Mildred Law as Helene Ford
Leon Belasco as Phillipe
Maurice Cass as Woolens
The Delta Rhythm Boys as Themselves
The Lyttle Sisters as Themselves

References

External links
 

1945 films
American comedy films
1945 comedy films
Universal Pictures films
Films directed by Ford Beebe
American black-and-white films
1940s English-language films
1940s American films